Teulisna obliquistria is a moth of the family Erebidae. It is found in south-east Asia.

The wingspan is 25–29 mm. Adults are on wing in April and August.

Subspecies
Teulisna obliquistria obliquistria (Burma)
Teulisna obliquistria acutapex Strand, 1917 (Taiwan)

References

Moths described in 1894
obliquistria